In snakes, intercanthals are scales on top of the snout located between the canthal scales.

References

Snake scales